Joseph Ravoahangy Andrianavalona Hospital (CHUJRA) is the largest hospital in Madagascar. Located in the Ampefiloha area of Antananarivo and founded in 1965, it is named for Joseph Ravoahangy Andrianavalona (28 October 1893 - 21 August 1970), a Malagasy physician and politician. The hospital was featured on a Malagasy postage stamp in 1972.

References

Hospitals in Madagascar
Hospitals established in 1965
1996 establishments in Madagascar